Nicky Alister Low (born 6 January 1992) is a Scottish footballer who plays as a midfielder and has signed for Clydebank until end of 2022-2023 season.

Low has previously played for Dundee, Aberdeen, Forfar Athletic, Alloa Athletic, Derry City, Queen of the South, Arbroath and had a loan spell at Kelty Hearts.

Club career

Aberdeen
On 27 January 2010, Low debuted for the Dons versus Heart of Midlothian, appearing as a substitute. Aberdeen won the match 3–0.

On 30 August 2011, Low was sent out on loan to Forfar Athletic until 1 January 2012. After impressing on loan, Low returned to the Loons until the end of the 2011-12 season. During his time at Station Park, Low was voted Supporter's Player of the Year and Young Sky Blues Player of the Year. On 18 October 2012, Low signed for Alloa Athletic, on loan initially for one month. Low's loan spell was then extended until 1 January 2014 before returning to Pittrodrie.

On 29 December 2013, Low scored his first goal for the Dons in a 1–0 victory versus Ross County. On 16 March in the 2014 Scottish League Cup Final versus Inverness Caledonian Thistle, Low appeared as a 70th minute substitute, scoring a spot kick in the penalty shoot-out victory for Aberdeen. On 15 May 2014, Low signed a new one-year contract with the Dons.

Dundee
On 20 April 2015, Low signed a pre-contract to sign for Dundee on a three-year deal from the start of the 2015-16 season.

Derry City
In January 2017, Low was sent out on loan to Northern Irish club Derry City. In June 2017, Low's loan spell was extended until 7 November 2017, before returning to Dens Park. On 31 January 2018, Low returned to the Candystripes after winning the previous season's Player of the Year and Players' Player of the Year awards. In May 2018, Low was released by Dundee  and then signed for the Candystripes on a permanent deal.

Low played in 56 matches for City, scoring three goals.

Queen of the South
On 27 December 2018, Low agreed to sign for Dumfries club Queen of the South when the transfer window opened on 1 January 2019, with his contract scheduled to run until the end of the 2018-19 season.

East Stirlingshire
On 14 May 2019, Low signed a pre-contract to join East Stirlingshire in the Lowland League for the 2019-20 season. Low enjoyed a successful first season at the club, scoring 14 goals and registering 13 assists from central midfield in the Lowland League, as well as scoring once in the Scottish Cup, with a 30 yard free kick in a 3-2 loss to Broxburn Athletic.  In the Coronavirus shortened season of 2019–20, Low picked up both the Players’ Player and Fans Player of the Year awards.

Low was announced as the new club captain on 11 September 2020. With the Lowland League under suspension, Low was loaned to Arbroath in March 2021.

Arbroath
Following the expiry of his contract with East Stirlingshire, Low signed a two-year contract with Scottish Championship side Arbroath in May 2021. Low would enjoy a successful 2021–22 season which saw the part-time Lichties compete for the Championship title in what became worldwide news.

Loan to Kelty Hearts 
On 9 September 2022, Low joined Scottish League One side Kelty Hearts on loan until January. Despite extending his loan until the end of the season, Low would leave Kelty and Arbroath in February 2023.

Clydebank 
In February 2023, Low joined West of Scotland Football League Premier Division club Clydebank until the end of the season.

Career statistics

Honours

Aberdeen
 Scottish League Cup winner (1): 2013–14

Derry City
League of Ireland Cup winner (1):  2018

References

External links

1992 births
Living people
Scottish footballers
Scottish Premier League players
Scottish Football League players
Scottish Professional Football League players
Aberdeen F.C. players
Forfar Athletic F.C. players
Alloa Athletic F.C. players
Association football midfielders
Scotland youth international footballers
Dundee F.C. players
Derry City F.C. players
League of Ireland players
Queen of the South F.C. players
East Stirlingshire F.C. players
Lowland Football League players
Arbroath F.C. players
Kelty Hearts F.C. players
West of Scotland Football League players
Clydebank F.C. players